Arnaudija Mosque built in 1594, is a large mosque in Banja Luka, Bosnia and Herzegovina before it was destroyed by the Army of Republika Srpska on 7 May 1993. Arnaudija is designated National Monument, by the Commission to Preserve National Monuments of Bosnia and Herzegovina.

The mosque was demolished by explosives on May 7, 1993, by the Serb militia. The demolition was organized by the authorities of the Republika Srpska which included the demolition of the entire Arnaudija mosque complex and Ferhadija mosque complex that were approximately  distant from each other. Both mosques were destroyed in the same night just within the time frame of 15 minutes.

One of the Serbs leaders from Banja Luka, Radoslav Brđanin was convicted for his part in organizing the ethnic cleansing of the non-Serbs and destruction of the properties of Muslims, including mosques. Radoslav Brđanin was sentenced to a single sentence of 32 years of imprisonment. The reconstruction of Arnaudija mosque started in April 2017 and is expected to finish in 2022.

See also
 Islam in Bosnia and Herzegovina
 List of mosques in Bosnia and Herzegovina

External links
 panoramio.com

References

Mosques completed in 1594
Architecture in Bosnia and Herzegovina
Buildings and structures in Banja Luka
Buildings and structures in Republika Srpska
Attacks on religious buildings and structures during the Bosnian War
Destroyed mosques
Ottoman mosques in Bosnia and Herzegovina
1594 establishments in the Ottoman Empire
National Monuments of Bosnia and Herzegovina
Mosques destroyed by Christians
Buildings and structures demolished in 1993